A number of places are known as Ward Hill:

Ward Hill, Hoy, a 481 m hill on Hoy, Orkney, Scotland
Ward Hill, a neighborhood of Haverhill, Massachusetts, United States
Ward Hill, South Australia, a locality on the Yorke Peninsula in South Australia, Australia
Ward Hill, Staten Island, a neighborhood on Staten Island, New York, United States

See also
Hill of Ward, in County Meath, Ireland
Ward Hall (disambiguation)